Museum of the Great Patriotic War may refer to one of the following.

Museum of the Great Patriotic War, Moscow
Museum of the Great Patriotic War, Minsk
National Museum of the History of Ukraine in the Second World War - former Museum of the Great Patriotic War in Kiev